I Cover the Underworld is a 1955 American crime film directed by R. G. Springsteen and written by John K. Butler. The film stars Sean McClory, Joanne Jordan, Ray Middleton, Jaclynne Greene, Lee Van Cleef and James Griffith. The film was released on May 19, 1955, by Republic Pictures.

Plot

Cast      
Sean McClory as Gunner O'Hara & John O'Hara
Joanne Jordan as Joan Marlowe
Ray Middleton as Police Chief Corbett
Jaclynne Greene as Gilda
Lee Van Cleef as Flash Logan
James Griffith as Smiley Di Angelo
Hugh Sanders as Tim Donovan
Roy Roberts as District Attorney
Peter Mamakos as Charlie Green
Robert Crosson as Danny Marlowe
Frank Gerstle as Dum-Dum Wilson
Willis Bouchey as Warden Lewis J. Johnson
Philip Van Zandt as Jake Freeman

References

External links 

 

1955 films
American crime films
1955 crime films
Republic Pictures films
Films directed by R. G. Springsteen
1950s English-language films
1950s American films
American black-and-white films